Bingen may refer to:

Places
 Bingen am Rhein, Germany, a town
 Bingen (Rhein) Hauptbahnhof, a railway station
 Bingen, Baden-Württemberg, Germany, a municipality
 Bingen Forest, Rhineland-Palatinate, Germany
 Bingen, Washington, United States, a city
 Bingen Cirque, a cirque (type of valley) in Queen Maud Land, Antarctica

People
 Bingen (surname)
 Bingen Fernández (born 1972), Spanish former professional road bicycle racer
 Bingen Zupiria, 21st century Spanish politician

Other uses
 Bingen (horse) (1893-1913), an American racehorse
 Bingen Technical University of Applied Sciences, Bingen am Rhein

See also
 Bertha of Bingen (died ca. 757), German Roman Catholic saint and mother of Rupert of Bingen
 Rupert of Bingen (712–732), German Roman Catholic saint and son of Bertha of Bingen
 Hildegard of Bingen (1098–1179), German Roman Catholic saint, writer, composer, philosopher, Christian mystic, Benedictine abbess, visionary and polymath

